The 1975 ATP Nations Cup,  sponsored by  Reynolds Metals, was a men's team tennis tournament played on outdoor clay courts. It was the inaugural edition of the World Team Cup and took place in Kingston, Jamaica from 29 September through 5 October 1975. The tournament was played by the eight nations whose players were the highest ranked on the ATP ranking. Each team consisted of two or three players and the prize money for the event was $100,000.

The United States defeated Great Britain in the final to win the title an $35,000 first prize money.

Players

John Alexander 
Ross Case 

Patricio Cornejo 
Jaime Fillol
Belus Prajoux

Commonwealth Caribbean
John Antonas
Richard Russell

Roger Taylor 
Buster Mottram 

Anand Amritraj 
Vijay Amritraj 

 Joaquín Loyo Mayo
 Raúl Ramírez 

Jürgen Fassbender 
Hans-Jürgen Pohmann

Arthur Ashe 
Roscoe Tanner

First round

United States vs. Mexico

Chile vs. West Germany

India vs. Australia

Great Britain vs. Commonwealth Caribbean (Jamaica)

Semifinal

United States vs. Chile

Great Britain vs. India

Final

United States vs. Great Britain

See also
 1975 Davis Cup
 1975 Federation Cup

References

World Team Cup
World
1975 in Jamaican sport
Tennis in Jamaica